Fame X, with Indian subtitle Chal Udiye, is an Indian television music talent show contested by aspiring pop singers drawn from public auditions. It followed an earlier Indian singing competition and musical reality show called Fame Gurukul.

2006-2007 edition
The sole season was in November 2006 and it extended until the finals in 2007. It was broadcast on Indian SAB TV television station. The dean of the show was Palash Sen. Auditions were held in Ahmedabad, Jaipur, Delhi, Kolkata and Mumbai. Originally the host was Sophie Choudry, but she was replaced in later stages by Shilpa Sakhlani.

The weekly Fame X show was complemented with a daily Monday to Friday show entitled Fame X Academy. The winner would get Rs50,00,000 grand prize, a recording contract and MTV Artiste of the Month title where the winner would be featured for a full month. He will also get the chance to sing for the Indian cricket team at the World Cup 2007

The judges were:
Nikhil Chinapa, an MTV India VJ
Ganesh Hegde, an Indian singer, performer, video director and Bollywood choreographer 
Daler Mehndi, Indian traditional Punjabi singer

Hosts:
Sophie Choudry (originally)
Shilpa Saklani (later in the series)

The finalists, with ages and region originating from:
Anandroopa Bagchi, 19 years, Bihar
Priyadarshee Banerjee, 23 years, West Bengal
Arunima Bhattacharya, 23 years, West Bengal
Alok Chaubey, 18 years, Bihar 
Ashutosh Jain, 23 years, New Delhi
Aditya Jassi, 24 years, New Delhi
Samrat Kaushal, 22 years, Punjab
Rehan Khan, 23 years, Mumbai
Neethi Nair, 19 years, Mumbai
Trupti Pandkar, 20 years, Maharashtra
Vidhhan Pandey, 21 years, Uttar Pradesh
Ritu Pathak, 19 years, Madhya Pradesh
Priyanka Purohit, 23 years, Rajasthan
Jyotika Sharma, 19 years, Mumbai
Rakesh Sharma, 30 years, Chhattisgarh
Rohitraj Sinha, 24 years, Allahabad

The winner of that only edition was Rehan Khan who beat in the finals Neethi Nair and Anandrupa Bagchi.

References

External links
Fame X Official website
Fame X News Article

Sony SAB original programming
Indian reality television series
2006 Indian television series debuts
2007 Indian television series debuts